Organopoda carnearia is a species of moth of the family Geometridae. It is found in Japan, Indonesia, Sri Lanka and Taiwan.

Description
The wingspan is about 27–36 mm. Pinkish-rufous moth with a fuscous tinge. Frons bright chestnut colored. Vertex of head and shaft of antennae whitish. Forewings with a fuscous fascia below costa. There are irregularly waved fuscous antemedial, postmedial, and submarginal lines, where the two latter bent inwards below vein 2. A dark discocellular speck present. Hindwings with fuscous edged white annulus at end of cell. An irregularly waved postmedial line present. Ventral side pinkish.

References

Moths described in 1861
Sterrhinae
Moths of Japan